Thomas Conolly (23 February 1823 – 10 August 1876) was an Irish Conservative Party politician.
He was a  Member of Parliament (MP) for Donegal from 1849 until his death in 1876, aged 53. The Conolly summer residence 'Cliff House' on the banks of the River Erne between Belleek, County Fermanagh and Ballyshannon County Donegal was demolished as part of the Erne Hydroelectric scheme, which constructed the Cliff and Cathaleen's Fall hydroelectric power stations. Cliff hydroelectric power station was constructed on the site of 'Cliff House' and was commissioned in 1950.

References

External links 
 

1823 births
1876 deaths
Members of the Parliament of the United Kingdom for County Donegal constituencies (1801–1922)
UK MPs 1847–1852
UK MPs 1852–1857
UK MPs 1857–1859
UK MPs 1859–1865
UK MPs 1865–1868
UK MPs 1868–1874
UK MPs 1874–1880
Irish Conservative Party MPs